Nebyloye is a rural locality (a selo) and the administrative center of Nebylovskoye Rural Settlement, Yuryev-Polsky District, Vladimir Oblast, Russia. The population was 1,528 as of 2010. There are 12 streets.

Geography 
Nebyloye is located on the Yakhroma River, 28 km southeast of Yuryev-Polsky (the district's administrative centre) by road. Andreyevskoye is the nearest rural locality.

References 

Rural localities in Yuryev-Polsky District
Vladimirsky Uyezd